James H. Harvey III (born July 13, 1923) is a retired United States Army Air Corps/U.S. Air Force (USAF) officer and former African-American fighter pilot with the 332nd Fighter Group's 99th Fighter Squadron, best known as the Tuskegee Airmen, "Red Tails," or among enemy German pilots,  ("Black birdmen"). He is one of the 1007 documented Tuskegee Airmen Pilots.

Harvey is best known as the first African American USAF jet fighter combat pilot to fight in the Korean War. Harvey and his 332nd Fighter Group Weapons pilot team won the USAF's inaugural "Top Gun" team competition in 1949. Harvey — along with every member of the Tuskegee Airmen — received the Congressional Gold Medal in 2006.
Harvey, along with Dr. Harold Brown, George Hardy, and fellow 1949 Top Gun winner Harry Stewart, Jr., are among the last surviving members of the Tuskegee Airmen.

Early life and education
Harvey was born in Montclair, New Jersey on July 13, 1923. He was the son of James Harvey and Cornelia Harvey. The oldest of four children, Harvey had 3 siblings: brother Charles and sisters Dorothy and Cornelia.

Harvey attended primary school in Silver Lake, Essex County, New Jersey and Montclair, New Jersey. In 1930, his family moved from Montclair to Wilkes-Barre, Pennsylvania. In 1936, the Harveys moved to Nuangola Station in Northeastern Pennsylvania where they were the sole African-American family in the area.

Harvey attended high school in Mountain Top, Pennsylvania, An excellent student, Harvey served as President of his senior class, anchor man on the tumbling team, captain of the basketball team, and class valedictorian.

World War II military career

Harvey attempted to enlist with the United States Army Air Corps in January 1943; however, he was turned down because of his race.

Drafted into the U.S. Army in April 1943, Harvey was initially assigned to the United States Army Air Corps as an engineer. After applying for the Aviation Cadet Training Program, Harvey took the Cadet Training Exam at Bolling Field, and was admitted to the Tuskegee Flight School's Aviation Cadet Training Program. After attending Basic Training in Biloxi, Mississippi for thirty days, Harvey was transferred to Tuskegee Army Air Field to begin pilot training. On October 16, 1944, Harvey graduated from the Tuskegee Flight Program Army Air as a member of Class 44-4, receiving both his wings and a commission as Second Lieutenant Flying Officer. In April 1945, Harvey completed combat training in Walterboro, South Carolina at Walterboro Army Air Field where over 500 Tuskegee Airmen trained as replacement pilots for the 332nd Fighter Group and the entire 447th Bombardment Group until the base closed in October 1945.

The United States Army Air Corps assigned Harvey to 99th Fighter Squadron in Godman Field, Kentucky. However, Harvey and his squadron did not engage in combat during World War II.

Winner of the 1949 "Top Gun Competition"
In January 1949, the Chief of Staff of the U.S. Air Force sent out a directive to each Air Force group requesting their participation in an aerial weapons competition. Four months later in May 1949, Harvey joined the 332nd Fighter Group Weapons three-member pilot team to compete at the U.S. Air Force's inaugural "Top Gun" team competition held at the Las Vegas Air Force Base (now Nellis Air Force Base).

A grueling 10-day event, the competition comprised six events: aerial gunnery at 20,000 feet, aerial gunnery at 12,000 feet, dive bombing, skip bombing, rocketing firing, and panel strafing. His team lead from start to finish.

Harvey's 332nd Fighter Group team included the 100th Squadron's First Lieutenant Harry Stewart, Jr., the 300th Squadron's Captain Alva Temple, 99th Squadron's First Lieutenant Halbert Alexander (who served as an alternate pilot), and Staff Sergeant Buford A. Johnson (August 30, 1927 – April 15, 2017) as aircraft crew chief. Harvey and his team competed in P-47N Thunderbolts.

The results and the 3-foot high silver winning trophy (stashed in a Wright Patterson Air Force Base Museum storage area for 55 years) were absent from the Air Force archives until 1995. Flying F-47Ns, a variant of the Republic P-47 Thunderbolt, Harvey and his team won against U.S. Air Force fighter group teams in far more advanced aircraft.  Harvey remarked: "They knew who won, but did not want to recognize us."

Later career and retirement
In 1949, Harvey and fellow Tuskegee Airman Edward P. Drummond, Jr. (1926-2014) were transferred from Lockbourne AFB, Ohio to an F-80 squadron at the Misawa Air Base, Japan as a Fighter Pilot and Flight Commander. Harvey became the first African American jet fighter pilot to engage in combat during the Korean War. Harvey was awarded the Distinguished Flying Cross and several other Air Medals leading four F-80s amidst bad weather conditions during a bomber support mission October 16, 1950 near Yongsan, Korea (now the Yongsan District in Seoul, South Korea, inflicting heavy damage on an enemy encampment. Harvey flew 140 missions in Korea.

After the Korean War, Harvey served in multiple roles. In 1951, Harvey served as the Assistant Operations Officer, Instrument Instructor Pilot and Aircraft Test Pilot in the 94th Fighter Interceptor Squadron at George Air Force Base in California. In 1955, Harvey served as the Flying Safety Officer of the 27th NORAD Region, Norton AFB in California, receiving the Flight Rating of "Command Pilot". In 1956, Harvey became the Fighter Training Officer of North Eastern Air Command Headquarters at Pepperrell AFB in Newfoundland. In 1959, Harvey served as the Assistant Group Operations Officer of the 1st Fighter Group and the Operations Officer of the 71st Fighter Interceptor Squadron flying F-102 aircraft at Selfridge AFB in Michigan. In 1961, Harvey was assigned to Headquarters 30th NORAD Region, Truax Field, Wisconsin as a Weapons Director Staff Officer and later as Battle Staff Training Officer for the Commanding General and his staff.

On March 31, 1965, Harvey retired as a lieutenant colonel. He served a combined 22 years in the United States Army Air Corps and the United States Air Force.

On June 7, 1965, American meat and cold cut production company Oscar Mayer hired Harvey as a corporate Salesman, relocating his family of four girls across the U.S. In April 1972, Oscar Mayer transferred Harvey to Denver, Colorado where he lives today. He retired from Oscar Mayer in 1980.

Military awards
Harvey earned the following awards during his 22 year career in the United States Army Air Corps/U.S. Air Force:
 Distinguished Flying Cross
 Air Medal with 10 Oak Leaf Clusters
 *Congressional Gold Medal Awarded to Tuskegee Airmen in 2006.
 Distinguished Unit Citation with 10 Oak Leaf Clusters
 Good Conduct Medal
 American Campaign Medal
 World War II Victory Medal
 Army of Occupation Medal
 National Defense Service Medal
 Korean Service Medal with 2 Bronze Stars
 Air Force Longevity Service Award ribbon with 4 Bronze Oak Leaf Clusters
 Air Force Reserve Medal
 Republic of Korea Presidential Unit Citation
 United Nations Service Medal

Honors 
On March 29, 2007, Harvey — along with every member of the Tuskegee Airmen — was awarded the Congressional Gold Medal.

Aircraft flown
During his 22 year career, Harvey flew the following aircraft:
 Curtiss P-40 Warhawk
 Republic P-47 Thunderbolt
 North American P-51 Mustang
 Lockheed P-80 Shooting Star
 North American F-86 Sabre
 North American F-86D Sabre
 Northrop F-89 Scorpion
 Lockheed F-94 Starfire
 Lockheed T-33
 Convair F-102 Delta Dagger

See also

 Dogfights (TV series)
 Executive Order 9981
 List of Tuskegee Airmen Cadet Pilot Graduation Classes
 List of Tuskegee Airmen
 Military history of African Americans
 The Tuskegee Airmen (movie)

References

Notes

1923 births
Living people
Tuskegee Airmen
United States Army Air Forces officers
Military personnel from Tuskegee, Alabama
African-American aviators
Military personnel from New Jersey
People from Montclair, New Jersey
People from Wilkes-Barre, Pennsylvania
Langston University alumni
21st-century African-American people
Military personnel from Pennsylvania